McLain Airstrip, also known as Guimaras Airstrip or Guimaras Airport (Filipino: Paliparan ng Guimaras, Hiligaynon: Hulugpaan sang Guimaras), is an airstrip located at Brgy. McLain, Buenavista, Guimaras. Envisioned as the future unified international airport for the cities of Bacolod and Iloilo by former Guimaras Gov. Emily R. Lopez, the project was mothballed mainly because of the opening of the international airports in Cabatuan, Iloilo, serving Iloilo City, and Silay City, serving Bacolod City, and when Gov. Lopez retired from politics in 2004.

Current Use
Last April 17, 2013, the airport was opened to serve as a campus of the Philippine State College of Aeronautics (PhilSCA), in partnership with Guimaras State College and the Provincial Government of Guimaras. A memorandum was signed with the Lopez Family, owners of the land where the airport situated, represented by industrialist Oscar Lopez, for public use of the airport. PhilSCA will be tasked with renovating and completing the aerodrome facilities of the airport.

Commercial Flight
According to former Guimaras Gov. Felipe Hilan Nava, the airport is being planned for seasonal or limited regular commercial operations to boost the tourism industry of the province.

References

Airports in the Philippines
Buildings and structures in Guimaras